The 1853 Copenhagen cholera outbreak was a severe outbreak of cholera which occurred in Copenhagen, Denmark in 1853 as part of the third cholera pandemic. It killed about 4,800 people.

Background
Medical professionals had since the 1840s warned against the dismal sanitary conditions in the city as a combination of a lack of proper sanitary installations and services and increasing overpopulation due to the ban of urban development outside the City Walls.

Outbreak
The outbreak struck on 11 June 1853 and lasted until October when it faded out. A total of 7,219 infections were reported of whom 4,737 (56,7%) died. From Copenhagen the outbreak spread to the provinces where 24 towns were hit and 1,951 people died.

Aftermath

The cholera outbreak was a key factor in the decision to decommission Copenhagen's fortifications, although the step was long overdue and had been underway for decades. The cholera outbreak also contributed to the city's decision to build a new cattle market, the so-called Brown Meat District, and a safer municipal water supply.

It also resulted in several housing developments built by philanthropic organisations to provide healthy homes outside the city centre for people of few means. The Medical Society completed the first stage of the housing development now known as Brumleby in Østerbro in 1857. They are considered Denmark's first example of social housing. The Classenske Fideicommis acquired a three-hectare site in Frederiksberg in 1856 and constructed the Classen Terraces (De Classenske Boliger) between 1866 and 1881.

Notable victims
 Frederik Clauson-Kaas, hofmarskal
 Christoffer Wilhelm Eckersberg, painter
 Peter Christoph Hagemann, architect
 Carl Henckel, printmaker
 Frantz Christopher von Jessen, overpostmester
 Carl Løffler, decorative painter
 Jacob Ræder, military officer
 Adolph Schätzig, photographer
 Thomas Jacobsen, instrumentmaker

See also
 List of epidemics

References

External links
 Source
 Source

1853 disease outbreaks
1850s in Copenhagen
Disasters in Copenhagen
1853 in Denmark
Cholera outbreaks
19th century in Copenhagen
Disease outbreaks in Denmark
19th-century epidemics
1853 disasters in Denmark